Charles Kimberlin Brain, also known as C. K. "Bob" Brain (born 7 May 1931, in Southern Rhodesia, now modern Harare, Zimbabwe), is a South African paleontologist who has studied and taught African cave taphonomy for more than fifty years.

Biography
From 1965 to 1991, Brain directed the Transvaal Museum, which became one of the most scientifically productive institutions of its kind in Africa during his tenure.

During his years at the Museum, Brain actively pursued his own research, which was A-rated by the Foundation for Research Development (now the National Research Foundation of South Africa) from the inception of its evaluation system in 1984 until his retirement.

Brain planned and scripted the displays in the Museum's "Life’s Genesis I" and "Life's Genesis 2" halls, which have been seen by several million visitors.

Very early in Brain's career, Robert Ardrey wrote of him:

Although Brain retired in 1996, he is active as Curator Emeritus at the Transvaal Museum, an Honorary Professor of Zoology at the University of the Witswatersrand, an active Research Associate at the Bernard Price Institute for Palaeontological Research, and Chief Scientific Advisor to the Palaeo-Anthropology Scientific Trust (PAST).  He is an active researcher of fossils of the earliest animals and is co-ordinating a renewed excavation initiative at the Swartkrans Cave.  He is a consulting editor for the Annals of the Eastern Cape Museums.

In its 2006 Lifetime Achiever tribute to Brain, the National Research Foundation of South Africa said:
{{Quotation| Dr Brain was also personally involved and supervised a 30-year-long excavation of the Swartkrans Cave in the Sterkfontein Valley (now the Cradle of Humankind). This cave was the first to demonstrate the coexistence of robust ape men with early humans and produced more remains of robust ape men (Paranthropus) than any other site in the world. His objective was to obtain a large and meticulously documented sample of fossils and cultural objects from the complex stratigraphic units in the cave and to do taphonomic interpretations on these, throwing light on how the animals (including the hominids) lived and died.  His excavation produced a sample of 240,000 fossils from a very diverse fauna.  These emphasise the importance of predation to the evolution of human intelligence and provided evidence for the earliest controlled use of fire by humans nearly one million years ago. For nearly ten years Dr Brain has been looking for evidence of the oldest known predators among fossils of invertebrates from 700 million year old limestones in Namibia. His finds show how the predatory process started in the animal lineages." |National Research Foundation of South Africa|Newsletter.         }}

Brain has been an invited participant at over thirty international conferences and symposia worldwide.  He and his wife have four children.

A species of legless lizard, Typhlosaurus braini, is named in his honour.

Education
  Pretoria Boys High School
  BSc. in zoology and geology — University of the Witwatersrand, 1950.
  PhD in geology — University of the Witwatersrand, 1957.
  D.Sc. — University of the Witwatersrand, 1981.

Honours and awards
 Four Honorary Doctorates: 
 1999: University of the Witwatersrand
 1999: University of Pretoria
 1993: University of Natal
 1991: University of Cape Town

 2006:  National Research Foundation of South Africa (NRF) President's Lifetime Achiever award.
 1997: South Africa Medal of the Southern Africa Association for the Advancement of Science
 1992: Achievement Award of the Claude Harris Leon Foundation
 1991: John F. W. Herschel Medal of the Royal Society of South Africa
 1987: Senior Captain Scott Memorial Medal of the South African Biological Society

Scholarly scientific societies
In addition to other active memberships, Brain is a founding member of four societies:
 Palaeontological Society of Southern Africa
 South African Archaeological Society
 South African Society for Quaternary Research
 Zoological Society of Southern Africa
 1974–75: President
 1969–73: Vice President

Publications
 Nearly two hundred, including several books.

Books
 "Swartkrans: A Cave’s Chronicle of Early Man." (ed.) 2nd Edition. Transvaal Museum Monograph No. 8, 1–295, 2005.
 "Fifty years of fun with fossils: some cave taphonomy-related ideas and concepts that emerged between 1953 and 2003."  In African Taphonomy: A Tribute to the Career of C.K. "Bob" Brain.  Edited by Travis Pickering, Katherine Schick, and Nicholas Toth, Center for Research into the Anthropological Foundations of Technology (CRAFT Center), Stone Age Institute, Indiana University Bloomington, 2004.
Raymond Dart and our African origins.  In A Century of Nature: Twenty-One Discoveries that Changed Science and the World, Laura Garwin and Tim Lincoln, editors.   Chicago: University of Chicago Press, 2003.  Hardcover: .  Paperback: .
 The Hunters or the Hunted?: An Introduction to African Cave Taphonomy.  C.K. Brain.  Chicago: University of Chicago Press, 1981.   Paperback: , . Press page.

Scientific journals
(This list is very incomplete.)
 The Transvaal Ape-Man-Bearing Cave Deposits: An overview of the sites at Sterkfontein, Kromdraai, Swartkrans and Makapan.  Transvaal Museum Memoir No. 11, 1958.   (Dr. Brain's PhD thesis.)
 Reviewed by F. Clark Howell in Science, Volume 129, Issue 3354, p. 957.  April 1959.
 Republished in book form by "Netherlands Repro" (?)
 "The Narrative Concept in Museum Display."  South African Museums Association Bulletin 1978.
 "Visitor Reaction to the Life's Genesis Display."  South African Museums Association Bulletin 1979.

References

 A Tribute to the Career of C.K. "Bob" Brain.   African Taphonomy Conference, Stone Age Institute, 28 April – 1 May 2004, Indiana University Bloomington.
 Sponsored in part by the Wenner-Gren Foundation for Anthropological Research, founded and endowed in 1941 by Axel Wenner-Gren as the Viking Fund.
 "…scientists from around the world convened in Bloomington, Indiana to celebrate the life and career of Bob Brain, Curator Emeritus of the Transvaal Museum in Pretoria, South Africa.  Dr. Brain is an African prehistorian with over 50 years of experience in the natural sciences. He is best known for his research at famous ape-man cave sites in southern Africa."
 "Killer Cats Hunted Human Ancestors: Three South African scientists believe they have identified several predators that preyed upon human ancestors millions of years ago."   Shaun Smillie, National Geographic News'', 20 May 2002

External links
 Journal of Taphonomy.
 The Palaeontological Society of Southern Africa
 The South African Society for Quaternary Research
 The Southern African Archaeological Society
 The Zoological Society of Southern Africa

1931 births
Living people
South African paleontologists
Taphonomists
Alumni of Pretoria Boys High School
Academic staff of the University of the Witwatersrand
University of the Witwatersrand alumni
Fellows of the Royal Society of South Africa
Rhodesian emigrants to South Africa
Presidents of the South African Archaeological Society